was a  after Tenshō and before Keichō. This period spanned the years from December 1592 to October 1596.

Change of era
 1592 : The era name was changed. The previous era ended and a new one commenced in Tenshō 20.

Events of the Bunroku era
 1592 (Bunroku 1): Toyotomi Hideyoshi invades Korea (Bunroku no Eki), also known as Bunroku Keichō no Eki.
 1592 (Bunroku 1):  Ogasawara Sadayori claims to have discovered the Bonin Islands; and the territory was granted to him as a fief by Toyotomi Hideyoshi.
 1592 (Bunroku 1): Silver coins called Bunroku-tsūhō were minted to pay Hideyoshi's troops. The 23.25 mm diameter coins weighed 1 momme (approximately 3.75 g). Copper coins were issued at the same time, but none are known to have survived.
 1593 (Bunroku 2): Toyotomi Hideyori is born to Hideyoshi's mistress Yodo-Dono—an infant son and possible heir.
 1595 (Bunroku 4): Toyotomi Hidetsugu loses his position and power.

 1589-1595: An agrarian reform (Bunroku no Kenchi) initiated by Hideyoshi; a general census of the population and a national survey.

Notes

References
 
 Nussbaum, Louis Frédéric and Käthe Roth. (2005). Japan Encyclopedia. Cambridge: Harvard University Press. ; OCLC 48943301
 Sansom, George Bailey. (1958). A History of Japan, ; ;  OCLC 16859819
 Titsingh, Isaac. (1834). Nihon Odai Ichiran''; ou,  Annales des empereurs du Japon.  Paris: Royal Asiatic Society, Oriental Translation Fund of Great Britain and Ireland. OCLC 5850691

External links
 National Diet Library, "The Japanese Calendar" -- historical overview plus illustrative images from library's collection

Japanese eras
1590s in Japan